Charles Augustus Murray Littler  (26 March 1868 – 3 September 1916) was an Australian soldier. Born in  Launceston, Tasmania,  to Augustus East Littler and Hannah Sarah (née Murray), he married Helen Cotgrave Thomas in 1892 and had 3 sons. In 1910, Littler became manager of a rubber and coconut company on the island of Mindanao. Due to financial problems, he returned to Tasmania in 1914 and joined the Australian Imperial Force on 16 December. On 2 February 1915 he embarked for Egypt with 2/12th Battalion.

References

External links
Australian Monuments

1868 births
1916 deaths
People from Launceston, Tasmania
Australian Companions of the Distinguished Service Order
Australian Army officers
Australian military personnel killed in World War I